Ângela Portela (born February 3, 1962) is a Brazilian politician. She has represented Roraima in the Federal Senate from 2011 to 2019. Previously, she was a Deputy from Roraima from 2007 to 2011. She is a member of the Democratic Labour Party.

References

Living people
1962 births
Members of the Federal Senate (Brazil)
Members of the Chamber of Deputies (Brazil) from Roraima
Workers' Party (Brazil) politicians
Brazilian women in politics